The 18th century is a century of the Common Era which began on 1 January 1701 and ended on 31 December 1800, according to the Gregorian calendar.

18th century may also refer to:
 18th century BC
 The Eighteenth Century: Theory and Interpretation, an academic journal